Gurtler or Gürtler is a German surname. Notable people with the surname include:

Alfred Gürtler (1875 – 1933), Austrian statistician, economist and politician, Finance Minister
Elisabeth Gürtler (born 1950), Austrian businesswoman
Jan Gürtler (born 1970), German para table tennis player
John Gurtler, American sportscaster
Matt Gurtler, American politician
Robert Gurtler (born 1936), American magician known under his stage name André Kole
William Minot Guertler (1880-1959), German metallurgist

See also
73692 Gürtler, a main-belt asteroid named after Joachim Gürtler (born 1939)

German-language surnames
Occupational surnames